Jess Barbagallo is an American writer, director, and performer based in New York City. He has toured internationally and domestically with Big Dance Theater, the Builders Association, Theater of a Two-Headed Calf (and its Dyke Division) and Half Straddle.

Barbagallo has originated roles in  plays by Joshua Conkel, Casey Llewellyn, Normandy Sherwood, Trish Harnetiaux and many others. He appeared as Yann Fredericks in the original cast of Harry Potter and the Cursed Child at the Lyric Theatre on Broadway.

His playwrighting credits include Grey-Eyed Dogs (Dixon Place), Saturn Nights (Incubator Arts Center), Good Year for Hunters (New Ohio Theatre), Karen Davis Does … (Brooklyn Arts Exchange), Joe Ranono’s Yuletide Log and Other Fruitcakes (Dixon Place), Sentence Fetish (Brick Theater), Melissa, So Far (Andy’s Playhouse) and My Old Man (and Other Stories) (Dixon Place).

His writing has been published by Artforum, Howlround, Bomb Blog, New York Live Arts Blog: Context Notes, Brooklyn Rail and 53rd State Press. He is a 2009 Soho Rep Writer/Director Lab alum, a 2012 Queer Arts Mentorship mentee, and a 2013 MacDowell Colony Fellow.

In 2015, Barbagallo was selected to participate in the Persona Seminar think tank at the New Museum and was invited to the Clubbed Thumb Early Career Writer’s Group.

Barbagallo has taught theater and writing as a guest artist and adjunct lecturer at Duke University, New York University, University of Pennsylvania, Brooklyn College, the Vermont Young Playwright’s Festival and The O’Neill Center.

Filmography

Film

Television

Radio

Theater

References

External links
 
 

Year of birth missing (living people)
Living people
American LGBT dramatists and playwrights
Transgender dramatists and playwrights
American transgender writers